Grigoryevskaya is a rural locality (a village) in Spasskoye Rural Settlement, Tarnogsky District, Vologda Oblast, Russia. The population was 14 as of 2002.

Geography 
Grigoryevskaya is located 28 km northwest of Tarnogsky Gorodok (the district's administrative centre) by road. Dementyevskaya is the nearest rural locality.

References 

Rural localities in Tarnogsky District